The Fredensborg was a frigate built in Copenhagen in 1753. She was originally named Cron Prindz Christian after the crown prince, the future king Christian VII of Denmark and Norway, and was fitted out as a slave ship.

Service

As Cron Printz Christian
Following an initially unsuccessful stint in the triangular trade, her operational area was limited to the Caribbean, where she sailed as a trader until 1756.

As Fredensborg
The ship was then purchased by another Danish company, which renamed her Fredensborg after Fort Fredensborg, one of the Dano-Norwegian trading stations on the Danish Gold Coast. Her owners put her under the command of Captain Espen Kiønigs.

She embarked from Copenhagen on 24 June 1767 and arrived off the West African coast on 1 October. A cargo of slaves was collected at Fort Christiansborg and Fort Fredensborg, and the ship set sail for the Danish West Indies on 21 April 1768. She arrived at St Croix on 9 July, where the cargo of slaves were unloaded. She had embarked 265 slaves, and she disembarked 235, for a loss rate of 11%. Of the crew of 40, 12 had died en route. At some point Johan Frantzen Ferentz replaced Kiønigs as captain. She then sailed for home on 14 September.

Fate
On 1 December 1768, the Fredensborg sank in a storm off Tromøya island near Arendal, Norway.

The wreck was discovered by three divers in September 1974, Leif Svalesen, Tore Svalesen and Odd Keilon Ommundsen. Leif Svalesen later worked extensively to document the ship and its history.

See also
Fredensborg Castle
Fort Fredensborg
Danish slave trade

Literature
 Leif Svalesen: Slave Ship Fredensborg. Indiana University Press. 2000.

References

External links
 Source

1753 ships
Danish Gold Coast
Sailing ships of Denmark
Ships built in Copenhagen
Slave ships
Maritime incidents in Norway
Shipwrecks in the North Sea
Arendal
1753 in Denmark
Maritime incidents in 1768
Danish slave trade